Pentecostal Church in Indonesia (Gereja Pantekosta di Indonesia, GPdI) is a Pentecostal denomination of Indonesia. It was founded in 1921 and claims a seven-digit-membership. It used to bear the name Vereeniging De Pinkstergemeente in Nederlandsch Oost Indie. It is one of the largest Pentecostal denominations in Indonesia.

GPdI has a partnership connection with International Church of the Foursquare Gospel.

GPdI is currently led by Pdt. DR. John Weol. MM. MTh.

Doctrine
The teaching emphasized in this church is different from other charismatic churches. The most dominant is concerning the Holy Spirit in Acts 2 where the disciples experience the fullness of the Holy Spirit. With the power of the Holy Spirit Simon Peter and other disciples preached the gospel and the church was born. GPdI Church believes that there will be anti-Christ who will rule 3.5 years, the kingdom of 1000 years of peace, and the second coming of Jesus.

History
The establishment of the Pentecostal Church in Indonesia was inseparable from the arrival of two missionary families from the Church of Bethel Temple Seattle, USA to Indonesia in 1921 namely Rev. Cornelius Groesbeek and Rev. Dutch descendant Richard Van Klaveren immigrated to America. From Bali, the ministry switched to Surabaya on the island of Java in 1922, then to the oil city of Cepu in 1923. In this city F.G Van Gessel BPM employees repented and were filled with the Holy Spirit accompanied by many other Indonesian sons, including: H.N. Runkat, J. Repi, A. Tambuwun, J. Lumenta, E. Lesnussa, G.A Yokom, R.Mangindaan, W. Mamahit, S.I.P Lumoindong and A.E. Siwi later became a pioneer of the Pentecostal movement throughout Indonesia.
Due to rapid progress, on June 4, 1924 the Dutch East Indies Government recognized the existence of "De Pinkster Gemeente in Nederlansch Indie" as a legitimate "Vereeniging" (association). And by the power of the Holy Spirit and the high spirit of service, new churches began to grow everywhere.

On 4 June 1937, the government increased its recognition of the Pentecostal movement to "Kerkgenootschap" (church alliance) based on the Statutes of 1927 number 156 and 523, with Beslit Government No.33 dated 4 June 1937 Staadblad number 768 the name "pinkster Gemente" changed to "Pinkster in Indie Nederlansch. During the Japanese occupation in 1942, the Dutch name was changed to "Pentecostal Church in Indonesia". At that time the Chairperson of the Oemoem Pengoeroes Agency (Central Assembly) was Rev. H.N Runkat.

In addition to the developments, it was also necessary to note several divisions which later gave birth to new churches where the founders came from GPdI people, including: Rev. Ho Liong Seng (DR.H.L Senduk) founder of GBI church who was with Rev. Van Gessel in 1950 parted ways with GPdI and founded GBIS, Rev. Isaac Lew in 1959 left and founded GPPS, previously in 1936 Missionary R.M. Devin and R. Busby left and formed the Assemblies of God, in 1946 Rev. Tan Hok Tjoan separated and formed the Isa Almasih Church and so on.

The role of the pioneers is also worth remembering, because of their struggle the GPdI trees have grown heavily, they include: Rev. H.N. Runkat which penetrated fields on Java, (Jakarta, West Java, Central Java, etc.), 1929 Rev. Yulianus Repi and Rev. A. Tambuwun followed by Rev. A. Yokom, Rev. Lumenta, Rev. Runtuwailan attacked North Sulawesi, in 1939, from North Sulawesi / Ternante Pdt. E. Lesnussa to Makassar and its surroundings. In 1926 Rev. Nanlohy reaches the Maluku islands (Amahasa) which was then followed by Rev. Yoop Siloey, etc.

In 1928 Rev. S.I.P Lumoindong to D.I Yogyakarta in 1933 Rev. A.E. Siwi sows to Sumatra islands (South Sumatra, Lampung, West Sumatra and then 1939 to North Sumatra), 1932 Rev. RM Soeprapto began helping services in Blitar then Singosari dsk, in 1937 to Sitiarjo, South Malang. In 1935 Rev. Siloey et al. Pioneered services to Kupang NTT, 1930 Pdt. De Boer followed by Rev. E. Pattyradjawane and A.F Wessel to East Kalimantan. In 1940 Rev. JMP Coal cut down the West Kalimantan (Pontianak) field, Rev. Yonathan Itar is a pioneer of the Pentecostal Gospel in Irian Jaya, and others that cannot be mentioned one by one. By their sacrifice GPdI grew rapidly.

GPdI Organizational Structures
The highest forum in the GPdI forum is the Grand Conference held every 5 years. In addition to establishing the Work Program Outline (GBPK), the Mubes also functions to elect the GPdI National Leadership called the Central Assembly. The Central Assembly now has as many as 24 people, namely a General Chairperson, several Chairpersons, a General Secretary, a number of Secretaries, a General Treasurer, several Treasurers, and others leading departments, namely: Ministry of Evangelism, Pastoring, Education & Teaching, Organization, Church Growth, Diaconia, Development

Then the Central Assembly appointed 9 national level committee members called the Central Commission, namely: Pentecostal Children Services (PELNAP), Pentecostal Youth Services (PELRAP), Pentecostal Youth Services (PELPAP), Pentecostal Women's Services (PELWAP), Pentecostal Male Services (PELPRIP), Pentecostal Professional Services & Entrepreneurs (PELPRUP), Servants of the Servant (PELAHT), Pentecostal Student Services (PELMAP), Central Pentecostal Evangelism Commission.

After the Mubes are held, each region holds a Regional Deliberation (Musda) whose purpose, among others, is to elect regional leaders called the Regional Assembly. GPdI now has 32 regional assemblies, domestic and foreign, as follows: MD North Sumatra-NAD, MD West Sumatra, MD Riau, MD Kepri, MD Jambi, MD Sumsel, MD Bengkulu, MD Bangka-Belitung, MD Lampung, MD Banten, MD Jakarta, MD West Java, MD Central Java, MD Yogyakarta, MD East Java, MD Bali / NTB, MD NTT, MD West Kalimantan, MD Kalteng, MD Kaltim, MD South Kalimantan, MD Sulselbar, MD Sultra, MD Sulteng, MD Sulut, MD Gorontalo, MD North Maluku, MD Maluku, MD Papua, MD Australia, MD West Coast USA, MD East Coast USA.

After being elected, each MD also assigns administrators at the regional level according to the needs called the Regional Commission. In addition, MD also stipulates the Regional Assemblies as needed, and the Regional Assembly will determine the management of the forum at the regional level, called the Regional Commission. Each Regional Assembly oversees pastors who become the main base of GPdI services, and each pastor appoints board members at the congregation level.

How to be A GPdI Pastor
The ideal time for someone to reach the full Pastor degree at GPdI, on average ranges from 10 years (calculated from the start of fulltime in service). The long journey that must be taken is generally as follows: starting with the TC (Training Center) in a pastor at least 1 year, then entering a class 1 Bible School for 1 year - after that the service practices as a 'workman' at least 1 year, then enter Class 2 Bible School for 1 year, then start pioneering a new session with a very relative time of at least 1 more year. If you already have stable and routine services, MD will be determined to be a pastor with a title of Pdp (Assistant Pastor), and if the ministry develops 2 years later you will get the title Pdm (Young Priest). And if the Regional Assembly recommends again, then 2 years later the person concerned can be appointed as Full Pastor (Pdt).

Notable churches 
GPdI Ketapang, Jakarta. Led by Pdt. A. H. Mandey.
GPdI Beth Eden, Jakarta. Led by Ibu Pdt. Linda M. Thalib.
GPdI Bethlehem, Jakarta. Led by Pdt. Lidya Kairupan.
GPdI Obaja Tatelu Rondor, Minahasa Utara Led By Pdt. Linda Runtuwarow & Pdt. Jacky Lucky Polii
GPdI Bethesda, Jakarta. Led by Pdt. Hesky Rorong.
GPdI Cianjur, Cianjur, West Java. Led by. Pdt. J.E. Awondatu.
GPdI Jemaat Pamulang Permai, Jakarta. Led by Pdt. Freddy Kostaman.
GPdI Jemaat Eben-Haezer, Pangkalan Bun Kalimantan Tengah. Led by Pdt. Y. Samosir, S.Th.
GPdI Maranatha, Medan, North Sumatra. Led by Pdt. Dr. M.D. Wakkary.
GPdI El-Shaddai Medan, Medan. Led by Pdt. H.B. Tambuwun.
GPdI Jemaat Eben-Haezer, Kampung Lalang, Medan. Led by Pdt. Samuel Ghozali
GPdI Jemaat Eben-Haezer, Padang, West Sumatera. Led by Pdt. H.R. Pandeiroth
GPdI Pusat Manado, Manado, North Sulawesi. Led by Pdt. Ivonne Awuy-Lantu.
GPdI Bahu, Manado, North Sulawesi. Led by Pdt. D.P.E. Saerang.
GPdI Philadelphia Rap-rap Airmadidi North Minahasa, North Sulawesi. Led by Pdt DR Muhammad Syarifuddin Fecky Dihuma,S.Pak,M.Th
GPdI Rungkut Mapan Surabaya, Surabaya, East Java. Led by Pdt. Mieke Mandey.
GPdI Elohim Sidoarjo, Sidoarjo, East Java. Led by Pdt. Franklin Paul Lumoindong.
GPdI Sahabat Allah, Jakarta. Led by Pdt. Stephanus Paul
GPdI Bukit Zaitun Parepare, Parepare, South Sulawesi, Indonesia, Led by Pdt. Trephena Lesnussa
GPdI Bangkalan, (East Java) Led by Pdt.Zefanya Indrawan Walujo.
GPdI Filadelfia Tontalete, (North Minahasa) North Sulawesi. Led by. Pdt.dr Amelia Katuuk Pakasi
GPdI Galilea Motto, North Lembeh, Lembeh Island, Bitung City. Led by. Pdt. Finson Kabasarang
GPdI Victory Ranomerut, Minahasa Regency. Led by. Pdt. DR. J.H Karundeng, M.Th
GPdI Kedoya, Jakarta. Led by Pdt. David Sudarmawan
GPdI Anugerah Kiawa, Minahasa, North Sulawesi. Led by Pdt. Fr. Steven Longkutoy
GPdI EL-Shaddai Semboro,Jember, East Java. Led by Pdt.Lidia Ningsih Walujo.

GPdI also plants church overseas. United States:

Churches of GPdI USA:

• GPdI El Shaddai - Maryland. Led by Pdt. Charles Tulenan

• GPdI Winston-Salem - Winston-Salem, NC. Led by Pdt. Billy Mawuntu

• GPdI Calvary (Washington D.C. Area), Rockville, VA. Led by Pdt. Yohanis Albert Ticoalu.

• GPdI NLPC, Philadelphia, PA. Led by Pdt. Emmanuel Tandean.

• GPdI KFFM, New Haven, Connecticut. Led by Pdt. Steven Hanny Pongoh

• GPdI NLC, Chicago, Illinois. Led by Pdt. Jeamly Ticoalu

• GPdI ICFC, Washington, DC. Led by Pdt. Robinson Tulenan

• GPdI Scranton - Scranton, Pennsylvania. Led by Pdt. Lucky Carlo Tulenan

• GPdI Kalvari - Atlanta, Georgia. Led by Pdt. Maria Magdalena Siwi

• GPdI Hosanna Family Community Church - Houston, Texas. Led by Pdt. Samuel Wherry Tasik

More churches:
GPdI Christ Center Church New Jersey (CCC), Perth Amboy, NJ. Led by Pdt. Polke Koyongian
GPdI Harvest Family NH, Dover, New Hampshire. Led by Pdt. Donald Mawuntu
IPRF (International Pentecostal Revival Fellowship) Pomona, Los Angeles, CA. Led by Rev. Moody N. Ratu.
IPRF Las Vegas, Las Vegas, NV. Led by Pdt. Nurhaida "Ida" Simanungkalit.
IPRF San Francisco, San Francisco, CA. Led by Rev. Moody Ratu
IPFC (Indonesian Pentecostal Family Church) New York, New York, NY. Led by Pdt. Linda Suwidji.
Sacramento Revival Fellowship California. Led by Pdt. F. Senduk
GPdI LIFE Colorado (IPRF Colorado), Denver, CO. Led by Pdt. Pantas Situmeang.
IPRC (Indonesian Pentecostal Revival Church), New York, NY. Led by Pdt. Sammy Golioth.
GPdI Seattle (GPdI Washington Ministries) ], Seattle, WA. Led by Rev. Johannis Suwuh.
GPdI San Bernardino- California (CA). Led by Pdt. Daniel Wagey
SFIFC (San Francisco International Foursquare Church) San Francisco- California (CA). Led by Pdt. Edwin Katuuk
GPdI Foursquare San Francisco- California (CA). Led by Pdt. F. Senduk
GPdI Las Vegas- Nevada (NE). Led by Pdt. Stevie Paoki and Rilya Wuisan
GPdI Los Angeles- California (CA). Led by Raymond Lamandy
GPdI Denver- Colorado (CO). Led by Andy Miller
GPdI Concord- California (CA). Led by Otto Hutapea
GPdI Laguna- California (CA). Led by Daniel Pangau
Adonai Indonesian Church - Pleasanton, Bay Area - California (CA). Led by Pdt. Arie Quenta
Adonai Indonesian Church - Concord, Bay Area - California (CA). Led by Pdt. Arie Quenta

Australia:
GPdI Beth Eden, Earlwood, NSW. Led by Rev. Bernadus Maximillian "Max" Meiruntu.
Maranatha Ministry, Sydney, NSW. Led by Rev. Bernadus Maximillian "Max" Meiruntu.
GPDI Brisbane and Gold Coast (Queensland- QLD Led by Rev. Jerry Elrika Sanger, SH.

Malaysia:
Pertubuhan Imanuel Tawau-Sabah Malaysia, Tawau, Sabah, Malaysia. Led by Pdm.Andreas Petrus.
Pertubuhan Penganut Ugama Kristian Imanuel Lahat Datu, Lahat Datu, Sabah, Malaysia. Led by Pdm. Andreas Petrus.
Pertubuhan Persaudaraan Kristian Imanuel Sandakan, Sandakan, Sabah, Malaysia. Led by Pdt.Patri Tanan.
Other countries:
GPdI Vancouver Ministries, Vancouver, BC, Canada. Led by Rev. Grace Awuy.
GPdI Eben Haezer Belanda, Netherlands. Led by Rev. C. Lettelay.
Harvest Indonesia Fellowship Korea (GPdI Hati Elok), Seoul, South Korea. Led by Rev. Yohanes Praptowarso.
GPdI Singapura (Glad Tidings Church Indonesian Service), Upper Serangoon, Singapore. Led by Pdt. Paul Runkat.

Statement of Faith 
English Version 

We believe that The Holy Scripture is GOD’s Words implemented by The Holy Spirit, consisting of 66 books, from Genesis to Revelation (2 Timothy 3:16; 2 Peter 1:21).
We believe that the attributes of GOD's Deity is in the form of Trinity “GOD The Father, GOD the Son, and The Holy Spirit” (Deuteronomy 6:4; I Timothy 2:5; I John 5:7; Matthew 28:19), The One and Only GOD whose name is “Jesus Christ” (Acts 2:36; 8:12; 10:48; Matthew 1:1; Revelation 22:20-21; Acts 19:5; I Peter 3:15).
We believe that GOD is The Creator of the universe and mankind, stated in the book of Genesis (Genesis 1 & 2; John 1:1-3; Colossians 1:16; Romans 4:17; 1:19-20).
We believe that Jesus Christ, The Son of GOD, born as man (from the anointed Virgin Mary by The Holy Spirit), crucified and died on The Cross to bear our sins, buried, resurrected, and rose to The Heaven above, and will come again in The Second Coming. (John 20:31; Romans 1:4; I John 4:15; John 1:14; Philippians 2:7-8; II Timothy 3:16; Matthew 1:18; Isaiah 7:14; Luke 1:35; I Timothy 1:15; Acts 4:1-12; 10:42-43; Romans 6:4; I Corinthians 15:3-4; I Thessalonians 4:15,17).
We believe that The Holy Spirit is GOD’s figure, having His Divine characters of Immortality, Presence, Power, Wisdom, Holy, and Love. Baptism by The Holy Spirit is anointed and filled by The Holy Spirit, with manifestation of speaking in different languages supplemented by The Holy Spirit. Baptism is for those who repent from their sins and born again in Him (I John 5:7; II Corinthians 13:13; Hebrews 9:14; Psalm 139:7-10; Luke 1:35; Genesis 1:2; Job 26:13; Acts 2:4; 10:45-46; 19:6; Mark 16:17; John 7:38-39).
We believe in water baptism, submerged in the name of GOD The Father, GOD The Son, and The Holy Spirit. This baptism upon Jesus Christ’s will is mandatory for those who are saved, believe in Him, repent and born again in order to support GOD’s truth (Mark 16:15-16; Acts 2:38; 8:12, 37 & 39; Matthew 3:15; 28:19; Mark 1:15).
We believe in the salvation of spirit, soul, and body by GOD’s Grace and faith in Jesus Christ. The believers must maintain their covenant, holiness, faith; otherwise, the salvation will be annulled (Ephesians 2:8-9; Romans 10:9-10; I Corinthians 1:18; Philippians 2:12; Matthew 24:13; Hebrews 3:12; II Peter 2:20-22; 1:4-11; Jude 1:3).
We believe in the manifestations of The Holy Spirit among Jesus Christ’s followers (I Corinthians 12:4-11; 14:26).
We believe in The Lord’s Holy Sacrament, should be received by true believers (Luke 22:19-20; I Corinthians 11:23-26; John 6:53-56).
We believe in GOD’s Miraculous Healing over any kind of disease by The Power of Jesus’ precious blood in HIS Holy Name (Isaiah 53:4; I Peter 2:24; Acts 4:30; Mark 16:18).
We believe in GOD’s blessing and aspiration upon the birth of every child (Luke 2:22-27; Matthew 19:13-15; Mark 10:13-16; Luke 18:15-17).
We believe in The Solitary GOD’s Church, the fellowship of true believers, by which is holy and perfect as The Bride, kept aside for three and a half years in the tribulation; then transformed and lifted on The Second Coming of Jesus Christ (John 17:21-23; Ephesians 4:12-16; I Thessalonians 5:23; I Peter 5:10; I Thessalonians 5:4; I Corinthians 15:51).
We believe Jesus Christ is The Groom, The King of Kings, and The Lord of Lords, who will come and arbitrate the whole world in just, and will reign in The Thousand-Year-of-Peaceful Kingdom with the Bride, HIS Church (Acts 1:11; Revelation 22:7; I Corinthians 15:24-25; I Thessalonians 4:16-17; II Thessalonians 1:7-9; Revelation 20:10-15; Revelation 19:11-16; I Timothy 6:15).
We believe in the resurrection of the holy people before The Thousand-Year-of-Peaceful Kingdom and the resurrection of all sinners afterwards; the holy ones will receive the eternal life, but the sinners will face the final judgment before GOD’s Throne and get the endless punishment in the sea of fire in hell (Revelation 20:1-15; I Thessalonians 4:16-17).
We believe in the New World and atmosphere, full with The Truth and everlasting home for all Jesus Christ’s followers (I Peter 1:18-19; II Peter 3:13; Revelation 21:1-18).
We believe in the praise and worship gatherings that should be conducted regularly, with solemn and joy (Acts 2:25; Exodus 23:25; Hebrews 10:25; Psalms 47:2; 100:1-5; 134:2; 150:1-5).
We believe that every government is GOD”s authority to whom we must obey (Romans 13:4; I Peter 2:17; I Timothy 2:1-2; Proverbs 21:1).

See also 
Protestantism in Indonesia
Christianity in Indonesia

References

External links 
GPdI World  Official global GPdI website
IPRF (Indonesian Pentecostal Revival Fellowship) USA  Official website of GPdI in USA
List of GPdI Churches 

Protestantism in Indonesia
Pentecostal denominations in Asia
Evangelical denominations in Asia